Afroeurydemus caliginosus is a species of leaf beetle from Tanzania and the Democratic Republic of the Congo. It was first described by Édouard Lefèvre in 1891, as a species of Syagrus.

Subspecies
There are two subspecies of A. caliginosus:

 Afroeurydemus caliginosus caliginosus (Lefèvre, 1891): The nominotypical subspecies. Found in Tanzania.
 Afroeurydemus caliginosus discalis (Burgeon, 1941): Found in the Democratic Republic of the Congo.

References 

Eumolpinae
Insects of Tanzania
Beetles of the Democratic Republic of the Congo
Taxa named by Édouard Lefèvre